was a Japanese actor and voice actor. He was born in Hokkaido. His wife was voice actress Keiko Hanagata.

Shinohara was represented by Tokyo Actor's Consumer's Cooperative Society and later moved to 81 Produce until he died.

Filmography

TV drama

Films

Stage

Anime television

Video games

Dubbing

Films

TV series

Puppetry

Tokusatsu

CD

Radio

Narration

Voice overs

Others

References

External links
  
 

Japanese male voice actors
Male voice actors from Hokkaido
1933 births
2016 deaths
20th-century Japanese male actors
21st-century Japanese male actors
81 Produce voice actors
Tokyo Actor's Consumer's Cooperative Society voice actors